Richard Dennis Ralston (July 27, 1942 – December 6, 2020) was an American professional tennis player whose active career spanned the 1960s and 1970s.

As a young player, he was coached by tennis pro Pancho Gonzales. He attended the University of Southern California (USC) and won NCAA championships under its coach George Toley. He and partner Bill Bond captured the NCAA doubles title in 1964. He was the highest-ranked American player at the end of three consecutive years in the 1960s; Lance Tingay of The Daily Telegraph ranked him as high as world No. 5 in 1966 (Ralston was ranked world no. 3 by the magazine Reading Eagle in 1963).

His best result at a Grand Slam singles event came in 1966 when he was seeded sixth and reached the final of the Wimbledon Championships, which he lost to fourth-seeded Manuel Santana in straight sets. At the end of that year he turned professional.

Ralston was a member of the Handsome Eight, the initial group of players signed to the professional World Championship Tennis tour. He won 27 national doubles and singles titles, including five grand-slam doubles crowns.

Ralston, a Davis Cup winner with the US Davis Cup team in 1963, continued to serve in the team as a coach from 1968 to 1971 and as a captain from 1972 to 1975, winning the title in 1972 over Romania.

Ralston was the men's coach at Southern Methodist University between 1981–89 and 1991-93 (split when he helped Noah in 1989–90), being named the NCAA Coach of the Year in 1983, when SMU finished second nationally.

Ralston was inducted into the International Tennis Hall of Fame in 1987. In 2016, he was inducted into the Texas Tennis Hall of Fame.

Grand Slam finals

Singles, 1 final (1 runner-up)

Doubles, 9 finals (5 titles, 4 runners-up)

Mixed doubles, 4 finals (4 runners-up)

Grand Slam tournament performance timeline

Singles

Note: The Australian Open was held twice in 1977, in January and December.

References

External links
 
 
 
 

American male tennis players
French Championships (tennis) champions
Sportspeople from Bakersfield, California
International Tennis Hall of Fame inductees
Tennis people from California
USC Trojans men's tennis players
United States National champions (tennis)
Wimbledon champions (pre-Open Era)
1942 births
2020 deaths
Grand Slam (tennis) champions in men's doubles
Professional tennis players before the Open Era
Deaths from cancer in the United States